Sri M (born Mumtaz Ali Khan) is an Indian Yogi, spiritual guide, social reformer and educationist. He is an initiate of the Nath sub tradition of Hinduism and is the disciple of Sri Maheshwarnath Babaji, who was a disciple of Mahavatar Babaji. Sri M, also known as Sri Madhukarnath Ji, lives in Madanapalle, Andhra Pradesh, India. Sri M received the Padma Bhushan, India's third-highest civilian award, in 2020.

Early life
Mumtaz Ali Khan was born on 6 November 1949 to an affluent Muslim family in Trivandrum, Kerala. In his autobiography, Apprenticed to a Himalayan Master, Sri M describes meeting his guru Maheshwarnath Babaji in the garden of Sri M's home in Trivandrum: a distinguished, youthful-looking stranger with matted hair, standing near a jackfruit tree.  After a brief conversation, the stranger disappeared. This was a turning point in nine-year-old Sri M's life, and he later said about the meeting:

After this awakening, Sri M made contact with a number of South Indian saints who included Bhagawan Nityananda of Ganeshpuri, Yogi Gopala Saami, Kaladi Mastan, Swami Abhedananda, Chempazhanti Swami, Swami Tapasyananda and Mai Ma.

Quest for self-realisation

According to his autobiography, Sri M left his home at age nineteen to find his master in the Himalayas. Exhausted by the search, he met Sri Maheshwarnath Babaji—the same person he had met when he was nine—at the Vyasa Gufa (cave) near Badrinath. Sri M lived with Maheshwarnath for three-and-a-half years and learned many things. Initiated into the Nath tradition, his Kundalini energy was awakened. Sri M and Maheshwarnath traveled to a mutt in Tholing, Tibet. His desire to meet Grand Master Mahavatar Babaji was fulfilled on Nilkantha Hill with the help of Maheshwarnath. Sri M claimed that Mahavatar Babaji was his master in a previous life, and Maheshwarnath reportedly had the power to materialize and de-materialize in any form on earth or beyond.

Later years

After spending three years in the Himalayas as a wandering yogi with his master, Sri M said that he was asked by his master to go back and prepare for his life mission. He returned from the Himalayas and traveled throughout India, meeting gurus such as Neem Karoli Baba, Lakshman Joo and J. Krishnamurti. Sri M spent substantial time in the Ramakrishna Mission and the Krishnamurti Foundation. While associated with the foundation he met his future wife, Sunanda Sanadi; they have two adult children.

Sri M heads the Satsang Foundation, which runs two schools in Andhra Pradesh: the Peepal Grove School and the Satsang Vidyalaya. The Peepal Grove School, a boarding school, was inaugurated by former President of India A. P. J. Abdul Kalam in 2006. Satsang Vidyalaya is a free school for children in the Madanapalle area, where Sri M lives. The foundation began Bharat Yoga Vidya Kendra, a training programme for yoga teachers, in 2020. He writes in "Speaking Tree", a spiritual forum run by The Times of India. A documentary film, The Modern Mystic: Sri M of Madnapalle, was directed by Raja Choudhury in 2011.

In 2015, Sri M undertook a "Walk of Hope": a  padayatra from Kanyakumari to Kashmir. The walk began on 12 January, the birth anniversary of Swami Vivekananda (who had undertaken a similar journey over a century earlier). With a group of fellow travelers, Sri M walked through 11 Indian states and considered the Walk of Hope an exercise to restore the country's spirituality. The padayatra ended in Srinagar, Kashmir, on 29 April 2016.

Sri M published The Journey Continues, the second part of his autobiography, in 2017. It exceeds the earlier book in apparently-miraculous incidents; in the introduction, he wrote that his readers might think that he "had finally gone bonkers". Sri M detailed a number of his previous lives over a period of 2,000 years, during which he (or she; in several lives, he was a woman) was associated with Indian saints.

Books

 Apprenticed to a Himalayan Master - A Yogi's Autobiography. Magenta Press, 2010. . 
 Wisdom of the Rishis: The Three Upanishads (Ishavasya, Keno, Mandukya). Translated by Kamal Aswami. Satsang Communications, 2002. 
 Jewel in the Lotus: Deeper Aspects of Hinduism. Magenta Press, 2011. 
 The Little Guide to Greater Glory and a Happier Life. Magenta Press, 2014. 
 The Upanishads: Katha - Prashna – Mundaka. Magenta Press, 2017.  
 The Journey Continues A Sequel to 'Apprenticed to a Himalayan Master'. Magenta Press, 2017. 
 Shunya. Westland by Amazon, 2018.  
 On Meditation: Finding Infinite Bliss and Power Within. Penguin Random House India, 2019.   
 Yoga: Also for the Godless Westland, 2020.   
 The Homecoming and Other Stories. Penguin, 2020.   
 The Friend: Mind, Body, Soul, Well-Being. Penguin (28 June 2022)

References

External links
 Satsang Foundation
 Manav Ekta Mission
 Peepal Grove School

1948 births
Advaitin philosophers
Indian Hindu spiritual teachers
Indian autobiographers
Indian founders
Indian spiritual writers
Kriya yogis
Indian yogis
Indian yoga teachers
Living people
Recipients of the Padma Bhushan in other fields
Malayali Hindu saints